Bishop Douglass may refer to:

Bishop Douglass Catholic School, in the London Borough of Barnet
John Douglass (bishop) (1743–1812), English Roman Catholic bishop